This was the first edition of the tournament.

Mona Barthel and Kristýna Plíšková won the title, defeating Asia Muhammad and Maria Sanchez in the final, 6–3, 6–2.

Seeds

Draw

Draw

External Links
Main Draw

Oracle Challenger Series – Chicago - Doubles
Oracle Challenger Series – Chicago